The Mohawk and Malone Railway was a railroad that ran from the New York Central Railroad's main line at Herkimer north to Malone, crossing the northern Adirondacks at Tupper Lake Junction, just north of Tupper Lake. The road's founder, Dr. William Seward Webb, was president of the Wagner Palace Car Company and a Vanderbilt in-law. He then had track built from Tupper Lake to Moira and thence to Malone. A separate company, the St. Lawrence and Adirondack Railway (also controlled by Webb), completed the line to Montreal, Quebec.

The Mohawk and Malone opened in 1892 from Malone Junction to Childwold Station with a branch from Lake Clear Junction to Saranac Lake. The line was sometimes erroneously called the Adirondack and St. Lawrence Railroad (even though a separate company with this name also operated in this time). After 1893, it was controlled by the New York Central and Hudson River Railroad.

In 1913, it merged with the New York Central and Hudson River Railroad as the "Adirondack Division" of the New York Central.

Use for regional New York Central passenger train service in the 20th century
Through the first half of the 20th century, the New York Central ran day and night trains on the route for service from Utica to Montreal via Lake Clear Junction and Malone. In the post-World War II period, the NYC's North Star train, and later, the Iroquois, provided direct sleeping car service from New York City's Grand Central Terminal to Lake Placid. In 1953, the NYC terminated service north of Malone toward Montreal. In mid-1957, the company cut mainline service back from Malone to Lake Clear Junction, with all service terminating on the Lake Placid branch that left the division's main route at Lake Clear Junction. On April 24, 1965, the NYC ran its final train on the route.

In the 1990s, service on the southern segment of the route between Utica and Thendara would return with tourist excursions run by the Adirondack Scenic Railroad. In the mid-2010s, the State of New York attempted to convert most of the Utica-Lake Placid segment to a rail trail. However, the Adirondack Railroad successfully won an effort in court to resist rail removal. The New York State Supreme Court ultimately sided with the railroad on September 26, 2017, annulling the rail trail plan in its entirety.
In 2020, pro-trail advocates persuaded the New York State Legislature to amend the Adirondack Park Act to allow removal of former NYC tracks from Tupper Lake to Lake Placid (34 miles) and to build a new rail-trail there instead, thus negating the prior Court decisions. Track removal occurred between October, 2020 and November, 2021, with trail completion planned in 2024. New York State has completed renovation of the long-decayed tracks from Big Moose to Tupper Lake, and the Adirondack Railroad plans to expand passenger service from Utica beyond Thendara and Big Moose to Tupper Lake (108 miles) in Spring, 2023.

Stations
Stations served in final years of passenger service, 1957 to 1965
Lake Placid station
Ray Brook
Saranac Lake Union Depot
Lake Clear Junction
Tupper Lake
Childwold (service eliminated between 1959 and 1960)
Sabattis
Big Moose
Thendara station (noted on NYC timetables as near Old Forge, a resort village, 1.9 miles to the northeast)
Remsen station (service eliminated between 1959 and 1960)
Utica Union Station

See also
Adirondack Scenic Railroad
New York Central Railroad Adirondack Division Historic District

References

External links
Prototype History - The Adirondack Line
New York Times, "FINANCIAL ANNOUNCEMENTS.; Mohawk and Malone Bonds." May 13, 1893.
New York Times, "NOW FOR THE ADIRONDACKS.; DR. WEBB'S RAILROAD OPEN FOR BUSINESS." June 26, 1892
Details for several of line's stations

Defunct New York (state) railroads
Railway companies established in 1892
Railway companies disestablished in 1913
Predecessors of the New York Central Railroad
3 ft gauge railways in the United States
Subdivisions of the New York Central Railroad